The 2017–18 Women's FA Cup was the 48th staging of the FA Women's Cup, a knockout cup competition for women's football teams in England. Manchester City were the defending champions, having beaten Birmingham City 4–1 in the previous final.

Teams 
A total of 276 teams had their entries to the tournament accepted by The Football Association. One hundred and eighty-five teams entered at the first or second round qualifying. Teams that play in the FA Women's Premier League Division One were given exemption to the Third Round Qualifying, while teams in the Northern and Southern Division entered at the Second Round Proper. Teams in the FA WSL were exempted to the Fourth Round Proper.

The First Round Qualifying saw five ties cancelled due to the withdrawal of one of the teams, with two additional ties awarded to the losing teams after the winning teams were disqualified. The Second Round Qualifying saw two ties cancelled as a result of withdrawals, while the Third Round Qualifying saw one withdrawal with one additional tie awarded to the losing team after disqualification. The First Round Proper saw one tie cancelled due to the withdrawal of Basingstoke Town after an initial postponement.

First round qualifying
Eighty seven matches were scheduled for the first qualifying round. Most matches were played on Sunday 3 September 2017, the only exception being Buckland Athletic v Exeter City, which took place on the following Sunday after the match was initially postponed due to a waterlogged pitch.

Second round qualifying
Forty nine matches were scheduled for the second qualifying round. The 98 teams taking part consisted of 11 teams exempted to this stage, plus the 87 match winners from the previous round. Most matches were played on Sunday 17 September 2017, the only exception being Woodley United v Alton, which was delayed for a week due to the late disqualification of Oxford City.

Third round qualifying
Forty eight matches were scheduled for the third qualifying round. The 96 teams taking part consisted of 47 teams from the FA Women's Premier League Division One exempted to this stage, plus the 49 match winners from the previous round. Most matches were played on Sunday 8 October 2017, except two which were postponed to the following week.

First round proper
Twenty four matches were scheduled for the first round proper. Twenty three matches were played on Sunday 12 November 2017, with Plymouth Argyle v Basingstoke Town postponed to the following Sunday before being awarded to Plymouth following Basingstoke's withdrawal.

Second round proper
Twenty four matches were scheduled for the second round proper. The 48 teams taking part consisted of 24 match winners from the previous round, plus the 24 teams from the FA Women's Premier League Northern and Southern Division exempted to this stage. Most matches were played on Sunday 3 December 2017, the only exception being Brighouse Town v Wolverhampton Wanderers which were postponed from the original scheduled date due to a waterlogged pitch, and then postponed again the following week due to safety concern following an Amber weather warning from the Met Office.

Third round proper
Twelve matches were scheduled for the third round proper. Eleven matches were played on Sunday 7 January 2018, with Derby County v Brighouse Town postponed to the following week due to an unplayable pitch.

Fourth round proper
Sixteen matches were scheduled for the fourth round proper. The 32 teams taking part consists of 12 match winners from the previous round, plus the 20 teams from the FA WSL exempted to this stage. Fifteen matches were played on Sunday 4 February 2018, with Plymouth Argyle v Leicester City Women postponed to the following week due to an unplayable pitch.

Fifth round proper
Eight matches were scheduled for the fifth round proper. All eight matches were played on Sunday 18 February 2018.

Quarter-finals
The four matches of the quarter-finals were scheduled to be played on Sunday 18 March 2018 but only one was completed on this date, with the other three postponed till the following week.

Semi-finals

Final

Television rights

Notes and references

Notes

References

Women's FA Cup seasons
Cup